Hafiz Indonesia is a religious talent search program aired on RCTI during Ramadan. This event is one of RCTI's flagship programs that showcases children's ability to recite and memorize a series of Al Qur'an.

The program received an award from the Indonesian Broadcasting Commission as Program Acara Ramadhan Terbaik  (English: Best Ramadan Program) on August 7, 2014. Hafiz Indonesia won the Panasonic Gobel Awards for "Best Children's Program" for 2 consecutive years (2014 and 2015).

Seasons 
The first season of Hafiz Indonesia was held in 2013. The show aired every Monday-Friday at 14:30 pm from July 8, 2013, to August 6, 2013. The first winner of Hafiz Indonesia 2013 is Hilya.

The 2nd season of Hafiz Indonesia aired every day at 14:00-16:00 WIB during Ramadan 1435/July 2014. Coming with a new format, 32 children from all over Indonesia showcased their ability to memorize and recite Quranic verses through 5 stages, namely:

 Stage Salamah (audition), (2013-2019)
 Stage Ikhtirah (audition), (2020–present)
 Stage Muqadimah (introducing), (2013-2020)
 Stage Ta'aruf (introducing), (2021–present)
 Stage Izaalah (elimination),
 Stage Syafa’at (wildcard),
 Stage Musabaqah (competition) and,
 Stage Wisuda Akbar (grand final).

This season the show is hosted by Irfan Hakim with four judges, namely Syeikh Ali Jaber, Prof. Dr. Nasaruddin Umar, Prof. Dr. Amir Faishol Fath, and Lulu Susanti. The best hafiz in 2014 was obtained by a 6-year-old participant from Bangka named Musa, who later became better known as Musa Hafiz kecil.

The event continued consecutively in 2015, 2016, 2017, 2018 and 2019. In general, each season has the format of the name Hafiz Indonesia [year], for example Hafiz Indonesia 2018.

In 2020, the audition round is known as Ikhtirah and there is no Intercession round. The Wildcard round was aired 1 day after Ikhtirah 4. Since 2017, the Jury was introduced Nabila Abdul Rahim Bayan.

List seasons

Winners

Winners

Category winners

Notes 

 The winner of the 2013 season only made the top four
 Lukman's victory in 2022 marks the end of the A prefix as the winner for the past 7 years (2015-2021), it is also the first year that the first-place winner is a foreigner.
 Hanny is the first participant with 2 Category Winners at once (Ahfadz & Akram)
 Ahsani, Ahmad, and Annisa are the winners of Hafiz Indonesia with 30 Juz of Qur'an memorization.

Achievements

See also 

 Hafiz Quran (Trans7)
 Qori Indonesia (RTV)
 Tilawah Cilik (TVRI)
 Pesantrend Indonesia (NET.)

References

External links 

 
 
 
 

2013 Indonesian television series debuts
Indonesian reality television series
Indonesian-language television shows
Arabic-language television shows
RCTI original programming
Ramadan special television shows